Severny-Kospashsky is a rural locality (a settlement) in Kizel Urban okrug, Perm Krai, Russia. The population was 1,400 as of 2010. There are 40 streets.

Geography 
Severny-Kospashsky is located 14 km northeast of Kizel (the district's administrative centre) by road. Tsentralny Kospashsky is the nearest rural locality.

References 

Rural localities in Perm Krai